This article presents the demographic history of Pakistan mainly through the census results. See Demographics of Pakistan for a more detailed overview of the country's present-day demographics.

Indus Valley Civilization
At its peak, the Indus Valley civilization, that covered mainly modern Pakistan as well as parts of Afghanistan and India, was mostly fertile land that may have had a population of over five million. The Indus cities are noted for their urban planning, baked brick houses, elaborate drainage systems, water supply systems, and clusters of large non-residential buildings.

Independence and transfer of population
After Partition of India in 1947, two-thirds of the Muslims resided in Pakistan (both east and West Pakistan) but a third resided in India.  According to 1951 census, Dominion of Pakistan (both East and West Pakistan) had a population of 75 million population, in which West Pakistan had a population of 33.7 million and East Pakistan (now Bangladesh) had a population of 42 million. This exchange of population had different impact within Pakistan itself. The migration of Hindus and Sikh from Khyber Pakhtunkhwa and Punjab to India and the settlement of Muslim Punjabis from India in Punjab created homogeneity in Khyber Pakhtunkhwa and Punjab. Balochistan remained unaffected but exchange of population shook the demographic balance in Sindh. Approximately 0.77 million Sindhi Hindus left for India and 1.2 million mainly Urdu speaking North Indian Muslims settled mainly in urban Sindh. In 1954, Urdu speakers constituted 20% of the population of Sindh. Unlike the migrants settling in Punjab who spoke the same language and shared the same lifestyles the North Indian Muslims settling in Sindh were socially, linguistically, culturally, politically and economically different from Sindhis.

Post Independence
The Intercensal growth rates between 1951 and 1981 indicated a rise in the population growth rate in the 1960s and 1970s largely attributed to the sharp declines in mortality seen in the 1950s and 1960s, which were not followed by any decline in fertility in those decades. Intercensal growth rates actually peaked in the 1961-72 period and continued at fairly high levels in 1972-81 after which they began to decline. The 1981-98 period records a decline to 2.6 indicating that growth rates in the last few years of the 17 years intercensal period are likely to have been lower. Pakistan’s fertility decline is a consequence of the rising age at marriage (for women, this increased from 16 to 23 between 1961 and 2007) and the “widespread recourse” to abortions.

Yearly population

Pakistan's yearly population from 1950 to 2014.

See also 
 Census in Pakistan
 1998 Pakistan Census

References

External links 
 Capturing the Demographic Dividend in Pakistan

 
Demographics of Pakistan
Social history of Pakistan
Pakistan